The 1965–66 TSV 1860 Munich season was the third season since the foundation of the Bundesliga in 1963.  This season, 1860 München won the Bundesliga title.  The club was  eliminated in the first round of the DFB-Pokal by SV Werder Bremen and in the quarterfinals of the Inter-Cities Fairs Cup by Chelsea F.C.  The top goal scorer this season was Friedhelm Konietzka who scored 26 goals in the Bundesliga and 33 goals overall.  Željko Perušić, Ludwig Bründl, Alfred Kohlhäufl, Helmut Richert and Konietzka joined the club this season.  Stevan Bena, Engelbert Kraus and Alfred Pyka left the club this season.

Match results

Legend

Bundesliga

League fixtures and results

League standings

DFB-Pokal

Inter-Cities Fairs Cup

Player information

Squad and statistics

Appearances and goals

Transfers

In

Out

Notes
1.Kickoff time in Central European Time.
2.1860 München goals listed first.

References

TSV 1860 Munich seasons
1860 Munchen season 1965-66
German football championship-winning seasons